Liu Wu (died 154 BC) was the son of Liu Yingke, Prince Yi of Chu. After the short reign of his father, he inherited the title Prince of Chu in 174 BC. In 155 BC, Empress Dowager Bo died.  Liu Wu was caught drinking during the grieving period, so Emperor Jing of Han reduced the size of his land. Wu was later convinced to join the Rebellion of the Seven States by Liu Pi despite objections from his prime minister and tutor. Liu Wu put both of them to death.

In 154 BC, he launched his campaign against the principality of Liang but was defeated by Zhou Yafu. When the remaining troops surrendered and his supplies were cut off, Wu committed suicide. His son Liu Li was allowed to succeed to the Prince of Chu title despite the rebellion. He had a granddaughter named Princess Jieyou.

References

154 BC deaths
Han dynasty imperial princes
Year of birth unknown